"Ponane Oi Agapes" is a 2013 pop song by the Greek-Cypriot singer Ivi Adamou. It was released on 31 May 2013.

Background and release 
The song was released via the official channel of Sony Music Greece. It is her second single that is written by Meth (Stavento), with the first being "Kano Mia Efhi".

Track listing
Digital download
"Ponane Oi Agapes" – 3:14

Credits and personnel
 Lead vocals – Ivi Adamou
 Producers – Meth
 Lyrics – Meth
 Label: Sony Music Greece

Music video 
It was announced through the official Facebook page that the shooting for the music video would start very soon. Also, suggestions from the fans were asked through the page. In mid-July some photos from the video's shooting were leaked. Some days later, on 24 July 2013, more photos from the shooting were published. The video is shot at Lake Doxa in Corinthia and is directed by Alexandros Grammatopoulos. The video was premiered on 2 August 2013.

Release history

References 

2013 singles
Greek-language songs
Ivi Adamou songs